is a Buddhist temple in Kyoto, founded by the priest Henjō.  The Emperor Kōkō endowed the temple and the emperor Kazan abdicated in this temple.

History
Gangyō-ji was founded in the early Heian period.

 877 (Gangyō 1): The temple is founded, and it takes its name from the era (nengō) in which it was first established.
 986 (Kanna 2): The emperor Kazan abdicated in this temple. He renounced his throne and the world. Two courtiers, the chūnagon Yoshikane and the sachūben (左中辨 middle-level controller of the left) Korenari, decided to follow the former emperor's example and became Buddhist priests themselves.

See also
 List of Buddhist temples in Kyoto
 For an explanation of terms concerning Japanese Buddhism, Japanese Buddhist art, and Japanese Buddhist temple architecture, see the Glossary of Japanese Buddhism.

Notes

References
 Ponsonby-Fane, Richard Arthur Brabazon. (1956). Kyoto: The Old Capital of Japan, 794-1869. Kyoto: The Ponsonby Memorial Society.
 Titsingh, Isaac. (1834). [Siyun-sai Rin-siyo/Hayashi Gahō, 1652], Nipon o daï itsi ran; ou,  Annales des empereurs du Japon.  Paris: Oriental Translation Fund of Great Britain and Ireland.

External links
 

Buddhist temples in Kyoto
Tendai temples